The Bangladesh Code is an official compilation and codification of laws in Bangladesh, which is published by the Ministry of Law, Justice and Parliamentary Affairs of the Government of Bangladesh. The code was initiated in 1973 and first published in 1977.

It has 38 volumes, of which 26 are in English and 12 are in Bengali. The code includes laws enacted in British India, Pakistan (1947–1971) and the People's Republic of Bangladesh. It begins with the Districts Act, 1836.

History
The draft of the British Indian Penal Code was prepared by the First Law Commission and it was chaired by Lord Macaulay. Its basis is the law of England freed from superfluities, technicalities and local peculiarities. Suggestions were also derived from the French Penal Code and from Livingstone's Code of Louisiana. The draft underwent a very careful revision at the hands of Sir Barnes Peacock, Chief Justice, and puisne Judges of the Calcutta Supreme Court who were members of the Legislative Council, and it was passed into law in 1860. Macaulay did not survive to see the Penal Code's enactment.

British Indian Penal Code remained affected in Pakistan after the partition. After independence, the code was initiated in 1973 and first published in 1977 by the Ministry of Law, Justice and Parliamentary Affairs in Bangladesh.

See also
United States Code

References

Law of Bangladesh